Tower Hill is an affluent government and residential neighborhood in central Freetown, Sierra Leone. Tower Hill is located within the central business district in downtown Freetown. Tower Hill is the seat of the government of Sierra Leone, as it is home to the State House (the office and residence of the Sierra Leone president). Tower Hill is also home to the Sierra Leone House of Parliament, the Ministry of Defence and National Security (Sierra Leone), the Bank of Sierra Leone, the Sierra Leone National Electoral Commission (NEC), and many other government buildings.

External links
statehouse.gov.sl
lonelyplanet.com

Neighbourhoods in Freetown